are small personal smoking-pipe-shaped writing sets from medieval Japan which provided a carrying box for the ink cotton, and a shaft for a brush (and possibly a letter opener).

Usage
 literally means "quiver". The name comes from the practice of early  who kept ink stones inside their quivers.

Japanese writing was traditionally done using the writing set inspired from China: an inking stone, a small stick of solid ink (which is turned to usable liquid ink by grinding on the inking stone and watering), and brushes. The complete set was easily portable and took time to prepare the materials for writing.

During the Kamakura period (1185–1333), the idea of ink-saturated cotton was developed. By touching a calligraphy brush to the cotton, one could ink the bristles with reduced risk of dripping or spilling ink. By enclosing the cotton in a little box, a writing set was made convenient and portable.

The first  were long boxes, with the ink compartment in the axis of the pen. The "smoking pipe" shape was designed to increase the quantity of available ink.

Some late  were made of a special alloy of gold and copper called , specifically designed to turn purple-black over time, and give the  its finish.

See also
 List of pen types, brands and companies

Notes

External links

Writing implements
Japanese tools
Japanese words and phrases